(born 1944) is a Japanese swimmer and Olympic medalist. He competed at the 1964 Summer Olympics in Tokyo, winning a bronze medal in 4 x 200 metre freestyle relay. He also participated at the 1968 Summer Olympics.

References

1944 births
Living people
Olympic swimmers of Japan
Olympic bronze medalists for Japan
Swimmers at the 1964 Summer Olympics
Swimmers at the 1968 Summer Olympics
Olympic bronze medalists in swimming
Japanese male freestyle swimmers
Asian Games medalists in swimming
Swimmers at the 1966 Asian Games
Swimmers at the 1970 Asian Games
Asian Games gold medalists for Japan
Asian Games silver medalists for Japan
Medalists at the 1966 Asian Games
Medalists at the 1970 Asian Games
Medalists at the 1964 Summer Olympics
Universiade medalists in swimming
Universiade bronze medalists for Japan
Medalists at the 1965 Summer Universiade
Medalists at the 1967 Summer Universiade
20th-century Japanese people